The Development Movement was a political movement in Georgia. It was founded by former speaker of Parliament of Georgia David Usupashvili and former members of Republican Party of Georgia and National Forum. The movement declared itself as centrist. It took part in 2017 Georgian local elections and obtained about 0.7% overall. DM's candidate for 2018 presidential election was David Usupashvili where he got 2.36% of votes.

In December 2019, the new political union Lelo for Georgia was established. Among the party, its founders are members of the Development Movement and New Rights, both of whom merged to form the new party. Members of Lelo for Georgia say that their goal will be to win the next parliamentary elections and form a government.

References

External links

2017 establishments in Georgia (country)
Centrist parties in Asia
Centrist parties in Europe
Liberal parties in Georgia (country)
Political parties established in 2017
Political parties in Georgia (country)
Pro-European political parties in Georgia (country)
Political parties disestablished in 2019